The One Hundred Seventeenth Ohio General Assembly was the legislative body of the state of Ohio in 1987 and 1988. In this General Assembly, the Ohio Senate was controlled by the Republican Party and the Ohio House of Representatives was controlled by the Democratic Party.  In the Senate, there were 18 Republicans and 15 Democrats. In the House, there were 61 Democrats and 38 Republicans.

Major events

Vacancies
January 2, 1987: Senator Buz Lukens (R-4th) resigns to take a seat in the United States House of Representatives.
November 23, 1987: Representative Vernon Cook (D-43rd) dies.

Appointments
January 4, 1987: Barry Levey is appointed to the 4th Senatorial District due to the resignation of Buz Lukens.
January 6, 1988: Wayne Jones is appointed to the 43rd House District following the death of Vernon Cook.

Senate

Leadership

Majority leadership
 President of the Senate: Paul Gillmor
 President pro tempore of the Senate: Stanley Aronoff
 Assistant pro tempore: Richard Finan
 Whip: David Hobson

Minority leadership
 Leader: Harry Meshel
 Assistant Leader: Neal Zimmers
 Whip: Eugene Branstool
 Assistant Whip: Michael White

Members of the 117th Ohio Senate

House of Representatives

Leadership

Majority leadership
 Speaker of the House: Vern Riffe
 President pro tempore of the House: Barney Quilter
 Floor Leader: Bill Mallory
 Assistant Majority Floor Leader: Vernon Cook
 Majority Whip: Patrick Sweeney
 Assistant Majority Whip: Judy Sheerer

Minority leadership
 Leader: Corwin Nixon
 Assistant Leader: Dave Johnson
 Whip: Jo Ann Davidson
 Assistant Whip: Lou Blessing

Members of the 117th Ohio House of Representatives

Appt.- Member was appointed to current House Seat

See also
Ohio House of Representatives membership, 126th General Assembly
Ohio House of Representatives membership, 125th General Assembly
 List of Ohio state legislatures

References
Ohio House of Representatives official website
Project Vote Smart – State House of Ohio
Map of Ohio House Districts
Ohio District Maps 2002–2012
2006 election results from Ohio Secretary of State

Ohio legislative sessions
Ohio
Ohio
1987 in Ohio
1988 in Ohio